Lukáš Palyza (born 10 November 1989) is a Czech basketball player for ERA Nymburk of the Czech Republic National Basketball League (NBL). He also represents the Czech Republic national team.

National team career
Palyza represented the Czech Republic national team at the EuroBasket 2017, and the 2019 FIBA World Cup.

References

1989 births
Living people
2019 FIBA Basketball World Cup players
Basketball Nymburk players
Basketball players at the 2020 Summer Olympics
BK Děčín players
BK NH Ostrava players
Czech expatriate basketball people in Germany
Czech expatriate basketball people in Poland
Czech men's basketball players
GTK Gliwice players
Medi Bayreuth players
Olympic basketball players of the Czech Republic
Small forwards
Sportspeople from Ostrava